The South Australian Railways Ge Class locomotives were built by Beyer, Peacock and Company for the Glenelg Railway Company in 1897, entering service as numbers 11 and 12. They entered service on the South Australian Railways (SAR) as Ge Class Nos. 165 and 166 on 16 December 1899 following the purchase of the Glenelg Railway Company. No. 166 was condemned on the 8th of April 1929, followed by No. 165 on 4 June 1935. They were both eventually scrapped.

References

Ge
Broad gauge locomotives in Australia
Beyer, Peacock locomotives
4-4-0T locomotives
Railway locomotives introduced in 1897

Passenger locomotives 
Scrapped locomotives